ITV Specials are a selection of programmes which focus on some of the biggest stars in music, dance and magic.

Since 15 January 2000, stars including Cheryl, Michael Flatley, the Spice Girls and Duran Duran have featured in these special programmes. They are presented by various presenters including Phillip Schofield, Christine Lampard, Paul O'Grady, Ben Shephard, Reggie Yates, Alan Titchmarsh, Fearne Cotton, Steve Jones, Holly Willoughby, Stephen Mulhern, Zoë Ball and Emma Willis.

Music specials
There are six main "types" or "series" of music specials aired on ITV. The basic format remains the same for most shows. Occasionally, the star/s of the show may also present their special (such as Michael Bublé on all occasions). The first special aired was Extreme Magic Extreme Danger on 15 January 2000, hosted by Ulrika Jonsson.
 
One Night Only – since 20 December 2008, fifth episode aired in March 2011. The first "series" of the franchise and was hosted by Myleene Klass in 2008, followed by Ben Shephard, Fearne Cotton in 2010 and most recently, Christine Lampard in 2011. Stars featured include Tom Jones, Rod Stewart and Bon Jovi.
For the Last Time – since 25 September 2010, second episode aired in December 2011. Both episodes have been hosted by Christine Lampard.
This is... – since 4 December 2010, fourth episode in April 2012. Third episode was hosted by Reggie Yates, starring Justin Bieber, and the fourth was hosted by Christine Lampard, starring Lionel Richie. 
The Nation's Favourite – a documentary series, celebrating music by a particular artist, group or theme. Viewers are able to vote for their favourite song in the category. Aired since 5 December 2010, it has been narrated by Kate Thornton, Amanda Holden, Fearne Cotton, Liza Tarbuck, Rufus Hound and more recently Zoë Ball in 2013.
A Night with... – two episodes aired in 2011. Featured artists were Will Young and Beyoncé, respectively. Hosted by Kate Thornton and later Steve Jones.
The One and Only – two episodes, first starring Des O'Connor in April 2012, second starring Cilla Black and hosted by Paul O'Grady in October 2013.

Other specials
Other specials have included Michael Flatley: A Night to Remember and Darcy Oake: Edge of Reality, both presented by Christine Lampard in 2014.

There have been "...Story" specials such as The Talent Show Story (narrated by Victoria Wood) and Come on Down! The Game Show Story (presented and narrated by Bradley Walsh). Stephen Mulhern has presented/narrated a few specials including The Magic Show Story and The Saturday Night Story, both of which aired in 2015.

Episodes

Music specials

Entertainment specials

The Real Full Monty
The Real Full Monty is a number of British television specials based on the 1997 film The Full Monty, featuring celebrities stripping to raise money for cancer charities. Ashley Banjo features in every special to coach the celebrities and choreograph.

The Real Full Monty (2017)
The first episode, titled The Real Full Monty aired on 15 June 2017 featuring eight male celebrities.

The Real Full Monty and The Real Full Monty: Ladies' Night (2018)
The Real Full Monty and The Real Full Monty: Ladies' Night aired on 28 and 29 March 2018.

The All New Monty: Who Bares Wins (2019)
The All New Monty: Who Bares Wins aired on 6 and 7 May 2019.

The Real Full Monty on Ice (2020)
The Real Full Monty on Ice featured two specials aired on 14 and 15 December 2020, themed around Dancing on Ice.

Strictly The Real Full Monty (2021)
Strictly The Real Full Monty featured two specials aired on 13 and 14 December 2021, themed around Strictly Come Dancing.

Documentary

References

2000 British television series debuts
2010s British television series
2020s British television series
British music television shows
ITV (TV network) original programming
Music television specials
Television series by Fremantle (company)
Television shows produced by Thames Television
Television series by ITV Studios
English-language television shows